These are the international rankings of Gabon

International rankings

References

Gabon